The 2014 Point Optical Curling Classic was held September 26-29 at the Nutana Curling Club in Saskatoon, Saskatchewan. It was the 39th edition of the event.  The event was held on Week 5 of the 2014–15 World Curling Tour. The event had a purse of $41,000 The winning team won $11,000. 

The Mike McEwen rink from Winnipeg won their second Point Optical Classic, defeating Toronto's John Epping rink in the final. It is the McEwen rink's second WCT win of the season, after having previously defeated Team Epping at the 2014 Stu Sells Oakville Tankard.

Teams

Teams are as follows (only skip name shown)
 Matthew Blandford - eliminated, 4 wins
 Brendan Bottcher - eliminated, 3 wins
 Reid Carruthers - eliminated, 1 win
 Brady Clark - eliminated, 1 win
 Dale Craig - eliminated, 0 wins
 Peter de Cruz - eliminated, 2 wins 
 Clint Dieno - C qualifier 
 Niklas Edin - B qualifier 
 John Epping - C qualifier 
 Brad Gushue - C qualifier 
 Jeff Hartung - eliminated, 2 wins
 Brad Jacobs - A qualifier 
 Kevin Koe - C qualifier
 Bruce Korte - eliminated, 3 wins
 Chad Lang - eliminated, 0 wins
 Steve Laycock - eliminated, 2 wins
 William Lyburn - eliminated, 0 wins
 Kevin Marsh - eliminated, 0 wins
 Mike McEwen - A qualifier 
 Sven Michel - eliminated, 1 win
 Yusuke Morozumi - B qualifier 
 Chris Plys - eliminated, 2 wins
 Robert Schlender - eliminated, 2 wins 
 Aaron Sluchinski - eliminated, 3 wins
 Jeff Stoughton - eliminated, 3 wins 
 Brock Virtue - eliminated, 2 wins

Playoffs

References

External links

Point Optical Curling Classic
2014 in Canadian curling
2014 in Saskatchewan
September 2014 sports events in Canada